Joseph or Joe Holmes may refer to:

 Joseph Holmes (New Jersey politician) (1736–1809), American politician
 Joseph Erskine Holmes (born 1940), Northern Irish politician
 Joseph John Holmes (1866–1942), Australian politician
 Joseph Warren Holmes (1824–1912), American sea captain
 Joseph William Holmes (1842–?), Canadian politician
 Joe Holmes (born 1963), American heavy metal guitarist
 Joe Holmes (rugby league), English rugby league footballer
 Joe Holmes (singer) (1906–1978), Irish fiddler, lilter and singer
 Joseph Holmes (photographer), American photographer
 Joseph Austin Holmes (1859–1915), American geologist and occupational safety and health pioneer
 Joseph R. Holmes (1838–1869), African-American politician